Dr Ruth Shaffrey  is an archaeologist.

Biography
Shaffrey was awarded her PhD in Archaeology and Geology from the University of Reading in 1998. She specialises in the study of quern-stones and millstones and is a worked stone specialist for Oxford Archaeology. Her thesis formed the basis of her 2006 BAR volume on Romano-British quern-stones. In February 2021 she reported on the discovery of a quern-stone decorated with a phallus from excavations on the A14 road in Cambridgeshire.

Shaffrey was elected as a Fellow of the Society of Antiquaries of London on 2 February 2019.

Select publications
Shaffrey, R. 2003. "The rotary querns from the Society of Antiquaries' excavations at Silchester, 1890--1909", Britannia 34, 143-174.
Mithen, S. J., Finlayson, B. and Shaffrey, R. 2005. "Sexual symbolism in the Early Neolithic of the southern Levant: pestles and mortars from WF16", Documenta Prahistorica, 32, 103-110.
Shaffrey, R. 2006. Grinding and milling : a study of Romano-British rotary querns and millstones made from Old Red Sandstone (BAR British Series 409). British Archaeological Reports. 
Shaffrey, R. and Roe, F. 2011. The Widening use of Lodsworth Stone: Neolithic to Romano-British Quern Distribution. In D.F. Williams and D.P.S. Peacock, (eds.) Bread for the People: The Archaeology of Mills and Milling, Archaeopress, Oxford, 309–324.
Ford, B. Poore, D. Shaffrey, R. and Wilkinson D.R.P. 2013. Excavations at the Oracle site, Reading, Berkshire, Thames Valley Landscapes monograph series.
Shaffrey, R. 2015. "Intensive milling practices in the Romano-British landscape of southern England. Using newly established criteria for distinguishing millstones from rotary querns", Britannia 46, 55–92.
Shaffrey, R. (ed) 2017. Written in Stone. Papers on the function, form and provenancing of prehistoric stone objects in memory of Fiona Roe.
Shaffrey, R. 2017. "Roman Ewell: a review of the querns and millstones and implications for understanding the organisation of grain processing". Surrey Archaeological Collections 100, 259-269. 
Shaffrey, R. 2018. "Grain processing in and around Roman Cirencester. What can the querns and millstones tell us about supply to the Roman town?", Trans Bristol and Gloucestershire Archaeol Soc 136, 161-70.
Shaffrey, R. 2019. "The movement of ideas in Late Iron Age and Early Roman Britain: an imported rotary quern design in south-western England, Britannia 50, 73-82.
Shaffrey, R. 2019. "A complete lower rotary quern from Chilworth, and how it assists in understanding the morphology of Lodsworth stone querns". Surrey Archaeological Collections 102, 265-272.
Shaffrey, R. 2021. "The rotary querns and millstones of Roman Exeter: supplying and feeding the Fortress and Town", in S. Rippon and N. Holbrook (eds.) Studies in the Roman and Medieval Archaeology of Exeter, Exeter: A Place in Time, volume 2, Oxbow Books, 415-426.

References

Fellows of the Society of Antiquaries of London
Year of birth uncertain
20th-century archaeologists
21st-century archaeologists
Geoarchaeologists
Year of birth missing (living people)
Living people